Chariesthes lomii is a species of beetle in the family Cerambycidae. It was described by Stephan von Breuning in 1938. It is known from Uganda and Somalia.

References

Chariesthes
Beetles described in 1938